The 2018 Botswana Cricket Association Women's T20I Series was a women's T20I cricket tournament held in Gaborone, Botswana from 20 to 25 August 2018. The participants were the women's national sides of Botswana, Lesotho, Malawi, Mozambique, Namibia and Sierra Leone. Matches were recognised as official WT20I games as per ICC's announcement that full WT20I status would apply to all matches played between women's teams of associate members after 1 July 2018. Zambia also took part in the tournament but their matches did not have WT20I status due to their squad including a non-eligible player, and their results are not included in the available coverage. The matches were played at two grounds at the Botswana Cricket Association Oval in Gaborone. Namibia Women won the tournament after winning all of their matches, including a victory over Sierra Leone in the final.

Round-robin stage

Points table

Matches

Playoffs

Fifth-place playoff

Third-place playoff

Final

References

External links
 Series home at ESPN Cricinfo

Cricket in Botswana
2018 in women's cricket